Péter Szabó (born 17 May 1968) is a Hungarian swimmer. He competed in the men's 200 metre breaststroke at the 1988 Summer Olympics.

References

External links
 

1968 births
Living people
Hungarian male swimmers
Olympic swimmers of Hungary
Swimmers at the 1988 Summer Olympics
People from Kaposvár
Sportspeople from Somogy County
20th-century Hungarian people
21st-century Hungarian people